I'm on My Way is a 1919 short comedy film featuring Harold Lloyd. A print of the film survives in the film archive of the Museum of Modern Art.

Cast
 Harold Lloyd as The Boy
 Snub Pollard 
 Bebe Daniels  
 Sammy Brooks (uncredited)
 William Gillespie (uncredited)
 Lew Harvey (uncredited)
 Bud Jamison (uncredited)
 Dee Lampton (uncredited)
 James Morrison (uncredited)
 Marie Mosquini (uncredited)
 James Parrott (uncredited)
 Dorothea Wolbert (uncredited)

Synopsis
It is The Boy's wedding day.  Clad in formal attire, he meets his impatient and domineering bride-to-be outside a bridal shop.  She is annoyed because The Boy is about a minute late.  She buys an enormous amount of last-minute items which The Boy has great difficulty carrying back to her home.  A neighbor of his fiancee invites The Boy to his abode to see his large family.  The Boy is appalled at how rowdy the family is.  Eventually The Boy escapes out a window and informs his fiancee that he has been cured of ever wanting to be a married man.

See also
 Harold Lloyd filmography

References

External links

1919 films
1919 short films
American silent short films
1919 comedy films
American black-and-white films
Films directed by Hal Roach
American comedy short films
1910s American films
Silent American comedy films